Hedaytul Islam (Ban Ho) Mosque, near the Chiang Mai Night Bazaar, is one of the biggest mosques in the province, and also one of the seven Chinese mosques in Chiang Mai.

History
It was first built in nineteenth century by a group of Chinese people, called Chin Ho or Hui, mostly from Yunnan Province.  The present-day buildings were built later, in Arabic, rather than Chinese-style, except in front of the prayer hall, where there is the Chinese phrase, "清真寺" or qingzhensi, which means a mosque (literally 'temple of purity and truth').

Education
Every Saturday and Sunday, there is a class for young Muslims, from 08:00 to the noon prayer (dhuhr). Every year the mosque enrolls, gratis, 20 students who cannot afford government school.

See also
Attaqwa Mosque
Islam in Thailand

References

Mosques in Chiang Mai